Eilema minutissima is a moth of the subfamily Arctiinae. It was described by George Thomas Bethune-Baker in 1911. It is found in Angola, Nigeria and South Africa.

References

minutissima
Moths described in 1911
Insects of West Africa
Insects of Angola
Moths of Africa